The 2015–16 FIS Ski Flying World Cup was the 19th official World Cup season in ski flying awarded with small crystal globe as the subdiscipline of FIS Ski Jumping World Cup.

Calendar

Men

Men

Standings

Ski Flying

Footnotes

References 

World cup
FIS Ski Flying World Cup